Jonathan Michael Murphy (born August 3, 1981) is an American actor. Born and raised in Arlington, Texas, he began acting in high school theater productions before moving on to community theater after college. He appeared in the ABC television series October Road as Ronnie Garrett and joined the cast of the ABC Family series Wildfire as Calvin Handley in season 4. Murphy was cast as Chris Skelton in the short-lived US version of Life On Mars opposite Harvey Keitel and Jason O'Mara. He also played in Ghost Whisperer (3x15).

External links

1981 births
Living people
American male film actors
American male television actors
People from Arlington, Texas
Male actors from Texas